Odom Inlet is an ice-filled inlet 9 miles long, between Cape Howard and Cape MacDonald along the east coast of Palmer Land. It was discovered by members of the US Antarctic Service (USAS) who explored this coast from East Base both by land and from the air in 1940, and named for Howard Odom, radio operator at the East Base.

Inlets of Palmer Land